Ian or Iain James may refer to:

 Ian James (athlete), Canadian Olympic long jumper
 Ian James (linguist), Cambridge University lecturer in French and fellow of Downing College, Cambridge
 Ian James (racing driver), British sportscar racer
Iain James, British singer-songwriter

See also